Asif Hossain is a Bangladeshi cricketer. He made his first-class debut for Dhaka Metropolis in the 2016–17 National Cricket League on 8 October 2016.

References

External links
 

Year of birth missing (living people)
Living people
Bangladeshi cricketers
Dhaka Metropolis cricketers
Place of birth missing (living people)